Romania ranks tenth in the world in terms of the diversity of minerals produced in the country. Around 60 different minerals are currently produced in Romania. The richest mineral deposits in the country are halite (sodium chloride). 

Romania is an oil producer, but the level of production is not enough to make the country self-sufficient. As a result, it is a net oil and gas importer.

The pipeline network in Romania included 1,738 km for crude oil, 2,321 km for petroleum products, and 708 km for natural gas in 1999. Several major new pipelines are planned, especially the Nabucco Pipeline for Caspian oilfields, the longest one in the world.

According to the CIA World Factbook, other natural resources include coal, iron ore, copper, chromium, uranium, antimony, mercury, gold, barite, borate, celestine (strontium), emery, feldspar, limestone, magnesite, marble, perlite, pumice, pyrites (sulfur), and clay alongside arable land and hydropower. In Roșia Montană area is the largest gold deposit in continental Europe, estimated at over 300 tons of gold and 1,600 tons of silver, having a value of $3 billion.

Romania's mineral production is adequate to supply its manufacturing output. Energy needs are also met by importing bituminous and anthracite coal and crude petroleum. In 2007 approximately 13.4 million tons of anthracite coal, approximately 4,000 tons of tungsten, 565,000 tons of iron ore, and 47,000 tons of zinc ore were mined. Lesser amounts of copper, lead, molybdenum, gold, silver, kaolin, and fluorite also were mined.

In 2016, Gabriel Resources launched arbitration and disclosed it sought $4.4 billion worth of damages from Romania at the World Bank. It accuses Romania of unfairly blocking the company's $2 billion project creating one of the continent's largest gold mines. The government then served the Canadian company with a $8.6 million taxes bill.

Figures 
In 2004, according to Europaworld.com, the main mining industries in thousand metric tons were:
 brown coal (including lignite): 31,592
 crude petroleum: 5,465
 iron ore: 275
 copper 786.8
 lead concentrates: 15.0
 zinc concentrates: 18.6
 salt (unrefined): 2,398
 natural gas (million cubic meters): 13,290

See also
 Roșia Montană Project

References

Economy of Romania
Mining in Romania
Romania